Malcolm Page may refer to:
Malcolm Page (footballer) (born 1947), Welsh footballer
Malcolm Page (sailor) (born 1972), Australian Olympic sailor